Nchanga Rangers is a Zambian football club based in Chingola that plays in the MTN/FAZ Super Division. They play their home games at Nchanga Stadium in Chingola.

The club is sponsored by Konkola Copper Mines.

Achievements
Zambian Premier League: 2
1980, 1998

Independence Cup: 1
1978

Zambian Challenge Cup: 3
1965, 1973, 1976

Zambian Charity Shield: 2
1980, 2002

Performance in CAF competitions
CAF Champions League: 1 appearance
1999 – First Round

 African Cup of Champions Clubs: 1 appearance
1981 – Quarter-final

CAF Confederation Cup: 1 appearance
2011 – First Round

CAF Cup: 2 appearances
1998 – Semi-final
2000 – Quarter-final

CAF Cup Winners' Cup: 2 appearances
1987 – Quarter-final
1997 – Second Round

Managers
 Fighton Simukonda (2012–16)
 Bruce Mwape (2016–21)
 Israel Mwanza (2021-to-date)

References

Football clubs in Zambia
Association football clubs established in 1960
1960 establishments in Northern Rhodesia